Berners Street is a thoroughfare located to the north of Oxford Street in the City of Westminster in the West End of London, originally developed as a residential street in the mid-18th century by property developer William Berners, and later devoted to larger commercial and semi-industrial buildings or mansion blocks of flats. It has associations with Charles Dickens, and was the location of makers of musical instruments including pianos and harps, as well as furniture and film-makers.

Geography 
Berners Street runs approximately 195 metres in a northerly direction from the junction of Oxford Street and Wardour Street to join up with Mortimer Street (formerly Charles Street) and the former Middlesex Hospital (now called Fitzroy Place). The street lies in an area known as Fitzrovia and is considered historically to be in East Marylebone. Twenty one trees were added to Berners Street in 2012.

History 
Berners Street was originally developed as a residential street by the Berners Estate in the mid-eighteenth century.

John Slater, surveyor of the Berners Estate, wrote in 1918:
{{blockquote|On 21st May 1738, William Berners let for ninety-nine years to Thomas Huddle the whole frontage of 655 feet to Oxford Street and 100 feet in depth (with the exception of width required for two proposed new streets – which would be the present Berners and Newman Streets and a widening of Wells Lane) at a total rent of 4s. per foot per annum. Huddle was to pull down all old buildings and to erect new ones, and Berners was to construct a sewer from Wells Lane to Rathbone Place. Huddle began to build the houses in Oxford Street at once, and apportioned there rents, the first lease for ninety-nine years being granted in 1739. The total annual rent received by the estate for the Oxford Street houses was £135 8s. until the last of the old leases fell in 1838. The sewer referred to still runs under some of the houses in Berners Street and Wells Street, but it is now disused. Between 1750 and 1763 the existing streets on the Estate were laid out: the first lease granted in Newman Street is dated 1750, in Charles Street, now called Mortimer Street, in 1759, in Castle Street and Wells Street in 1760, in Berners Street in 1763, and in Suffolk Street, now called Nassau Street, in 1764. Building must have gone on rapidly, for in 1773 there were existing sixty completed houses in Berners Street, twenty-three in Castle Street, thirty-five in Mortimer Street, exclusive of the Middlesex Hospital, ninety in Newman Street, and twenty-three in Nassau Street. Many of the houses show strongly the influence of the Brothers Adam, and some ceilings, which are very beautiful, were almost certainly from their original designs. A lease for 999 years was granted to the Middlesex Hospital in 1754"}}

Edward Walford, wrote in Old and New London (Volume 4), published 1878:

Walford records the proliferation of charitable and medical institutions in Berners Street during the 19th century:

Many of these institutions springing up in proximity to the Middlesex Hospital:

Edward Walford evokes something of the street market atmosphere at the corner of Berners Street and Charles Street so vividly described by Henry Mayhew in the 1840s and 50s:

Jamaica connections
On 2 November 1756, Dr Richard Bathurst delivered his resignation letter to the Board of the Middlesex Hospital, thus:

Genealogist Anne M. Powers wrote a study of the interchange between 18th-century Jamaica and mercantile London in her book and blog 'A Parcel of Ribbons', which gives some insight into Berners Street in colonial times:

Legacies of British Slave-ownership
The UCL Legacies of British Slave-ownership project explores the mechanisms by which wealth flowed from Caribbean plantations to metropolitan Britain. One such mechanism was the payment by UK taxpayers of approximately £10 million to compensate slave-owners after the abolition of slavery in the United Kingdom's American possessions in 1834. A map of beneficiaries in Bloomsbury and Fitzrovia shows beneficiaries in Berners Street included:
 John Elmslie, 21 Berners Street
There were claims for two large estates in Jamaica by the heirs of John Elmslie, who had died in August 1822 (St George no 324 and St Thomas-in-the-East no 468, total of £9176 7s 10d for 508 enslaved). In addition, compensation for St Thomas-in-the-East no 469 was awarded to the executors and executrix of John Elmslie junior, who had died in July 1829 (£2566 4s. 5d for 133 enslaved). Among the heirs of John Elmslie senior listed in Boyle's Directory of 1835 were his eldest surviving son James Elmslie at 18 Upper Gower Street, London; Mrs Elmslie, widow of his second son John junior, at 9 Upper Gloucester Place, London; and William Elmslie, fourth surviving son, at 24 York Street, Portman Square, London.
 Andrew Robertson, 19 Berners Street
Counterclaimed for 2 enslaved in Barbados (claim # 299) in right of his wife Ann Philips Boxill, stating that the late Rebecca Rowe who died in December 1831 bequeathed all her property to the said Ann Philips Boxill 'and two other persons' (T71/895). His address is given as 19 Berners Street. The award was made to the initial claimant, Thomas Boxill, as executor of Rebecca Rowe. Andrew Robertson of 19 Berners Street lodged another unsuccessful counterclaim with his wife Ann Phillips Robertson as legatee and annuitant under the will of Samuel Boxill (Barbados #264). This claim is for 122 enslaved on the Waterford Estate, Barbados. Samuel Boxill sold the enslaved to James D. Maycock, and the claim is awarded to Richard Deane as executor of John Higginson, surviving partner of Sir William Barton and George Irlam, creditors of Maycock.
 Rev. Stephen Isaacson, Berners Street
Claimant in right of his wife Anna Maria Miller Killikenny  of £60 4s 0d for 3 enslaved on Barbados (claim # 2432). Tentative identification as Rev Stephen Isaacson of Berners Street, on the provisional committee of the Cheltenam, Oxford and Brighton Junction Railway, and director of Galway & Ennis Railways (Times, 7 October 1845, p. 13). P. Kilkelly, 'merchant, of Barbadoes, Tavistock Square, is also on the provisional committee of the Barbados General Railway.

The UCL researchers commented:

Berners Street Hoax
The street was given notoriety by a practical joke, known as the Berners Street Hoax, perpetrated by the writer Theodore Hook in 1809. Hook had made a bet with his friend, Samuel Beazley, that he could transform any house in London into the most talked-about address in a week, which he achieved by sending out thousands of letters in the name of Mrs Tottenham, who lived at 54 Berners Street, requesting deliveries, visitors, and assistance. Hook stationed himself in the house directly opposite 54 Berners Street, from where he and his friend spent the day watching the chaos unfold. The site at 54 Berners Street is now occupied by the Sanderson Hotel.

Charles Booth
In October 1898, Charles Booth took a series of walks with Police Constable R.J. French of the Tottenham Court Road subdivision of the D police division and recorded observations in his notebooks for Life and Labour of the People of London. On 21 October he walked with PC French around "District 3" including the area "bounded on the North by Mortimer Street and Goodge St. on the East by Charlotte St. and Rathbone Place, on the South by Oxford Street and on the West by Regent St. being part of the parishes of All Souls and All Saints." Setting out from the corner of Goodge Street and Charlotte Street he walked north up Berners Street noting only "4 1/2 storeys, centre for music establishments, piano, instrument, music publishers etc."

Notable residents
Arts
 William Chambers, the architect and interior decorator, was able to build himself a house "in his own speculation", at 13, Berners Street, along with two adjacent houses, no. 14 for James Lacy and no. 15 for Thomas Rouse, all begun in 1764. According to his biographer John Harris, "Chambers's garden is terminated on the mews by a stable and adjacent a large room that must have been his drawing office, allowing access from the mews for the assistants. The rear of his house was decorated in papier mâché in a 'fanciful', perhaps Chinoiserie, style." Images of some of Chambers' interiors are held in the RIBA library.
 Thomas Collins, an ornamental plasterer who worked for, and was a friend and partner of Sir William Chambers.
 John Opie, the historical and portrait artist (8, Berners Street) until his death in 1807
 Henry Fuseli, the Swiss painter and draughtsman (13, Berners Street, the former home of William Chambers) 1803–

Literature
Berners Street is strongly associated with the writer Charles Dickens. Dickens' maternal great aunt, Mrs Charles Charlton, ran a lodging house at 16 Berners Street, and Dickens was often taken here by his mother, and got a job as a result in 1827. One of the lodgers was a young lawyer called Edward Blackmore, who was impressed by the youngster and employed him as a solicitor's clerk at Ellis & Blackmore in Grays Inn at the age of 15 (for more than twice the pay of Dickens' dreaded, and latterly famous, blacking factory job).

It was in Berners Street that, as a boy, Dickens saw a wandering woman, upon whom the character Miss Havisham from Great Expectations was based. Dickens described her as "a conceited old creature, cold and formal in manner" who was "dressed entirely in white with a ghastly white plaiting round her head and face inside her white bonnet." He added that she "went simpering mad on personal grounds alone – no doubt because a wealthy Quaker wouldn't marry her. This is her bridal dress. She is always walking up here… we observe in her mincing step and fishy eye that she intends to lead him a sharp life." This was in his essay "Where We Stopped Growing" which was published in Household Words on 1 January 1853.

Later in life, at 31 Berners Street, Dickens installed his secret young lover, the actress Ellen Lawless Ternan (nicknamed Nelly), who at 19 was 27 years younger than him, and the same age as his eldest daughter. It was September 1858 when she moved in accompanied by her mother Francis, who was an actress, and two sisters, Maria, another actress, and Fanny, a singer. After just a month Ellen and Maria reported to him that they were being pestered by a policeman, whom Dickens suspected of having been bribed by a man sexually interested in either or both of them. He complained of this "extraordinary, and dangerous and unwarrantable conduct in a policeman" whom he thought should be dismissed. But fear of publicity prevented him pursuing it. Perhaps that was why they all moved in March 1859 to Ampthill Square. Ellen had a habit of wearing scarlet geraniums and white heather in her hair. She was persuaded to give up acting by Dickens in August 1859, and received regular payments from his Coutts Bank account. On her death at the age of 75, she was buried in Southsea, close to where Dickens was born.
 Ellen Ternan, actress and mistress of Charles Dickens (31, Berners Street)
 Samuel Taylor Coleridge, the poet (71, Berners Street)

Other residents
Robert Cooper Lee (26, Berners Street) 30-year lease from 1771, subsequently moved to Bedford Square
John Slater, FRSA, architect and surveyor to the Berners Estate (46, Berners Street), c. 1891

By the end of the nineteenth century the area around Berners Street was no longer completely residential and development plots were being amalgamated for the erection of larger commercial and semi-industrial buildings or for mansion blocks of flats. Examples of such mansion blocks include the Edwardian Berners street mansions (34–36, Berners Street) and Lancaster Court.

Businesses and organisations
Furniture industry
From the 19th century Berners Street was the home of notable cabinet makers, upholsterers and furnishing companies including
 Lincrusta-Walton Wallcoverings, Showroom (9 Berners Street)
 Howard & Sons, furniture makers (22, 26 & 27, Berners Street)
 Filmer & Son, furniture makers (34, Berners Street)
 Sanderson, fabrics and wallpaper (49–57, Berners Street)
 Teale Fireplace Company, fireplace showroom (28, Berners Street)
 Well Fire & Foundry Company (15, Berners Street)
 Percy Heffer and Company, wallpaper showroom (64, Berners Street)
 Battam and Heywood, carver and gilder (Corner of Berners Street and 114, Oxford Street)
 Emerson's, 'art furniture', (Berners Street), c.1890, a shop established by Emmeline Pankhurst, which also acted as an estate agency, later moving to 223 Regent Street opposite Liberty's.

Hotels
During the 20th century several hotels became established on Berners Street including
 York Hotel, later converted into the mansion block known as York House (12, Berners Street)
 Berners Hotel (10, Berners Street, currently being redeveloped by Ian Schrager and Edition with Marriott International)
 Sanderson Hotel (49–57, Berners Street, formerly the head office of Sanderson)

Medical and charitable institutions
 Dr William Beale Marston's Museum of Science, Anatomy and The Wonders of Nature, opened (47, Berners Street)
 Madame Caplin's Anatomical and Physiological Gallery (for Ladies only) opened 1859 (58 Berners Street)
 Society for the Relief of Widows and Orphans of Medical Men, founded 1788 (53, Berners Street)
 The Medical and Chirurgical Society, established in 1805, and incorporated in 1834 (53, Berners Street)
 The Obstetrical Society of London, instituted in 1858 (53, Berners Street)
 The Pathological Society, founded in 1846 (53, Berners Street)
 The Clinical Society of London, founded 1868 (53, Berners Street)
 St. Peter's Hospital for Stone (54, Berners Street)
 Ladies' Sanitary Association (22, Berners Street)

Women's suffrage movement
 The Society for Promoting the Employment of Women (22, Berners Street)
 Berners Club for Women (9, Berners Street) c. 1871–1898.
Elizabeth Crawford noted in her work on the Women's Suffrage Movement: 

 Central Committee of the National Society for Women's Suffrage, founded 1867 (9, Berners Street)
 Ladies Town and Country Club (registered at Berners Street Mansions c. 1898–1900, secretary L. Jackson) and listed at 73 and 75 Mortimer Street until 1924.

Musical instrument makers
Piano makers
Various piano makers were located in Berners Street between 1820 and 1860, including:
 Robert Allison (29, Berners Street) c. 1837–1847
 Edward Dodd (3, Berners Street) fl. 1826–46
 John Cooper & Son (68, Berners Street)
 Philip George Holcombe (38, Berners Street) fl. 1855–60
 James Kennay & Co (15, Berners Street) fl. 1840–57
 Frederick Priestley (15, Berners Street) fl. c. 1850–60
 Challen & Son (3, Berners Street) 1859–60
 Henry Smart (27, Berners Street) fl. 1823–26
 John Cooper & Son (70, Berners Street) 1850–53
 Duff & Hodgson fl. 1843–60 (3, Berners Street) 1850
 Jacob & James Erart fl. c. 1855 (23, Berners Street) 1855
 Sandon & Steadman (Berners Street) c. 1890–1900

Harp makers
 Thomas Dodd, harp maker
Thomas Dodd came from a family of instrument makers – Dodd violin bows had been famous since the mid-1700. His father Edward died in 1810 at the very respectable age of 95. Dodd was mainly a dealer in instruments from 1809 to 1823, when he moved to Berners Street and then got interested in harps. He was also at Berwick Street in 1827 before returning to Berners Street. Thomas died in about 1830, and the business carried on until 1846 – presumably by means of his 2 sons (see Edward Dodd, 3, Berners Street). There is an 1822 patent for a laminated neck.
 Haarnack, harp maker (53 Berners Street)
There were several generations of Haarnack dating up to the mid-1920s. The business was at Charlotte Street and there was a showroom in Fitzroy Square. For a time they were also at 53 Berners Street down the road from Dodds. The first of the line was chief mechanic at Erards in 1808. Haarnack were one of the last makers to continue trading and also had a thriving repair business. Marie Goosens mentions meeting 3 generations at their shop in her book "Life on a Harpstring".
 Rudall, Carte & Co, a manufacturer of woodwind and brass instruments, was located at 23 Berners Street.

Music publishing
 Music Sales Group is Europe's largest printed music publisher, with headquarters in Berners Street, London. It owns the rights to hundreds of thousands of songs, imprints both for books and sheet music, operates the UK's largest chain of music shops, and sells sheet music, instruments and accessories direct through Musicroom.com.
 Novello & Co (1, Berners Street, 1867–1906) is a London-based printed music publishing company specialising in classical music, particularly choral repertoire. It was founded in 1811 by Vincent Novello.
 Performing Rights Society for Music (29–33 Berners Street), formerly the Performing Right Society, founded in 1914, is a UK copyright collection society and performance rights organisation undertaking collective rights management for musical works. PRS for Music was formed in 1997 as the MCPS-PRS Alliance, bringing together two collection societies: the Mechanical-Copyright Protection Society (MCPS) and Performing Right Society (PRS).

Film industry
The London Project records several businesses involved in the early film industry located in Berners Street:
 Barnard, W & Son, Artists Colours, (9, Berners Street) 1907
 Day and Night Screens Ltd, Screen Manufacturer and Supplier, (38a, Berners Street) 1913
 Duncan, Watson and Co, Electrical Engineers, (62, Berners Street) 1914
 Harrison and Co, Film Dealer, (66, Berners Street) 1900
 Keith Prowse & Co Ltd, Manufacturer of Automatic Machines, Automatic Pianos and Musical Instruments, Effects Machines, Bioscope Entertainment Provider, (38, Berners Street) 1909
 New Things Ltd, Automatic Pianos, (38, Berners Street) 1910
 Sichel, O & Co, Lens Manufacturer, (Berners Street) 1910
 Taylor, Taylor & Hobson Ltd, Lens Manufacturer (18, Berners Street) 1910

Miscellaneous businesses and organisations
• Abbott & co of Lancaster had an office at 18 Berners street circa 1904
 Schweppes Messrs J Schweppe & Co (51, Berners Street) 19th century
 International Maritime Organization (22, Berners Street) 20th century
 International Coffee Organization (22, Berners Street) 20th century
 The London Association for the Protection of Trade (16, Berners Street) 19th century
 A satellite office of Haymarket Media Group

Bourne and Hollingsworth
Bourne & Hollingsworth was a department store on the corner of Oxford Street and Berners Street. Its building was originally built in the late nineteenth century, and the store moved into the building in the early 1900s, remaining there until it closed in 1983. Bourne & Hollingsworth is featured in the 1954 Adelphi film The Crowded Day'', which follows one day in the life of a group of department store employees and was partially shot on location inside and outside the store.

References

Streets in the City of Westminster
Fitzrovia